The Serengeti-Park in Hodenhagen, Lower Saxony, is a zoo and leisure park in North Germany.

History
In 1972, the Duke of Bedford had the idea of building the largest safari park in Europe with partners from America. In 1974, this plan was realized and, since then, the Sepe family has run the park. When it opened the investors had spent about 20 million deutschmarks.
In 1983, the park was extensively renovated. Nowadays the park consists of three different areas: Serengeti-Safari, Jungle-Safari and Adventure-Safari.
In 1996, Serengeti Park was the first to release white rhinos, bred in Europe, back into the wild.

In 2003, Serengeti Park admitted its first white tiger. In 2004, Serengeti Park received permanent recognition as a zoological garden in accordance with current EU guideline 99/22/EG and §45 of the north German nature reserve law and on the basis of a LANA inspection.
23 March 2006 saw the first African elephant calf to be born in north Germany for 30 years.

On 27 August 2019, a 30-year-old rhinoceros called Kusini attacked a zookeeper's car and flipped it over at least three times in an incident captured on video. The zookeeper suffered minor injuries. Kusini arrived at the zoo 18 months prior to the incident as part of a breeding program and was reportedly struggling to adjust.

Zones
Serengeti Park is divided into three zones: Serengeti-Safari, Jungle-Safari and Adventure-Safari.

Serengeti-Safari

Alternatively visitors can use a Serengeti Bus. The zone is divided into 17 sections.

 Section 1 known as outdoor enclosure East Africa contains: eland, giraffe, blue wildebeest, waterbuck, sable antelope, Gemsbok, Patas Monkey, Ruffed Lemur
 Section 2, Central Africa: Kudu and Small Kudu, Sitatunga, Impala, Nile Lechwe and East African Bongo may be seen.
 Section 3, Europe: You can find Fallow Deer, Red Deer, Highland Cattle and mini ponies. 
 Section 4, West Africa: Dama Gazelle, Nyala, Oryx, Waterbuck. 
 Section 5, North America: Wapiti, Bison, Donkey
 Section 6, Russia: Sika Deer, blackbuck, Domestic Yak and Amur leopards may be seen.
 Section 7, South America: Spider Monkey, Rhea, Guanaco, Zebu, South American Tapir, Capybara
 Section 8, Asia: Père David's deer, Lar Gibbon, Nilgai, Blackbuck, Chital, Bactrian Camel
 Section 9: Bengal tiger and Striped Hyena
 Section 10: Lions
 Section 11: White Tiger
 Section 12: White Lion
 Section 13, North Africa: Sacred Baboon, Kulan, Ostrich, Dromedary, Barbary Sheep, Scimitar-Horned Oryx
 Section 14, Kenia: Cheetah, Flamingo
 Section 15, Southern Africa: Burchell's Zebra, Ostrich, Watussi Cattle, White Rhinoceros, Addax
 Section 16, Ivory Valley includes an enclosure with African elephants and Paintbrush Ear Pig 
 Section 17, Masai Mara:  Vervet Monkey, Giraffe, Ostrich, Crowned Crane, Black Wildebeest, Roans, Helmeted Guineafowl, White Stork, Gemsbok

Since early 2003, four white tigers have been added to Animal World in a new enclosure. The tigers were formerly part of Circus Barum and were given to Serengeti Park by Gerd Siemoneit-Barum on being retired. In December 2006, the first successful breeding of a tiger was achieved with the birth of tiger cub Paul.

Jungle-Safari 
Twenty different species of monkey live in the Jungle-Safari (for example: Barbary macaques, squirrel monkeys, mantled guereza, white-headed lemurs, tufted capuchins, ring-tailed lemurs, white-headed capuchins, green monkeys, patas monkeys, grey langurs, lar gibbons, cottontop tamarins, common marmosets, chimpanzees), some in walk-through enclosures. The Jungle Safari Tour also begins in there. This open-top bus tour takes part in the Serengeti-Safari in Safari style and also negotiates an off-road section with special effects.

Adventure-Safari
In Adventure-Safari there are over 40 different fairground rides suitable for children and adults, such as the Roller Coaster or Ferris Wheel. The Serengeti restaurant, Manyara, is also located there.

Shows

There are three different shows taking place regularly in Serengeti-Park:
 Kumeka - The Awakening of the Jungle
 Okavango - The Water Show
 Jambo Bongo - Get involved
 Additionally you can watch the staff feeding the monkeys in the Amboseli Reserve

Accommodation

Since 2007, it has been possible to stay at Serengeti Park.
Eighty holiday homes with a total of over 200 beds are available. In addition, there is a conference room with around 200 seats.

References

External links

 Official website of Serengeti Park
 Acoommodation at Serengeti Park

Safari parks
Animal theme parks
Zoos in Germany
Heidmark
Tourist attractions in Lower Saxony
Buildings and structures in Lower Saxony
Zoos established in 1974
1974 establishments in Germany